Mischell Miljević-Sachpekidis (born 30 October 1989) is a Swedish Serb football midfielder who plays for Radnik Surdulica in Serbian First League.

His father is Serb, and mother is Greek. His brother Kristijan is also footballer.

Honours
Radnik Surdulica
 Serbian First League: 2014–15

References

External links
 
 Mischell Miljević-Sachpekidis stats at footballdatabase.eu

1989 births
Living people
Sportspeople from Norrköping
Association football midfielders
Greek people of Serbian descent
Swedish people of Serbian descent
Swedish people of Greek descent
Swedish footballers
Serbian footballers
IF Sylvia players
Panserraikos F.C. players
FK Radnik Surdulica players
Serbian First League players
Footballers from Östergötland County
Serbian expatriate sportspeople in Greece
Swedish expatriate sportspeople in Greece
Serbian expatriate footballers
Swedish expatriate footballers
Expatriate footballers in Greece